Sir Granville Charles Hastings Wheler, 1st Baronet, CBE (1872–1927) was a British barrister and Conservative politician.

Educated at Eton College and Christ Church, Oxford, Wheler was called to the bar by the Middle Temple in 1898. He was Conservative MP for Faversham from the January 1910 general election until his death. He previously contested Osgoldcross at the 1906 general election, and the Colne Valley by-election, 1907.

During the First World War, he served in the British Army, reaching the rank of lieutenant-colonel.

Wheler was appointed CBE in 1920 and created a Baronet, of Otterden in the County of Kent, in 1925.

See also 

 Wheler baronets

Sources

Conservative Party (UK) MPs for English constituencies
Politics of Kent
1872 births
1927 deaths
Commanders of the Order of the British Empire
British Army officers
British Army personnel of World War I
Baronets in the Baronetage of the United Kingdom
Alumni of Christ Church, Oxford
Members of the Middle Temple
People educated at Eton College
English barristers

External links